Lamourouxia may refer to:
 Lamourouxia (bryozoan), a genus of bryozoans in the family Calloporidae
 Lamourouxia (plant), a genus of plants in the family Orobanchaceae
 Lamourouxia, a genus of red algae in the family Delesseriaceae, synonym of Claudea